Jebel Sherif (Jabal ash Sherif) is a mountain in southeastern Libya, about 130 km southwest of Kufra.  It was the site of an action during the Battle of Kufra.

References
https://nzetc.victoria.ac.nz/tm/scholarly/WH2-1Epi-fig-WH2-1Epi-e017a.html

Sherif